A.E. Farkadona F.C. is a Greek football club, based in Farkadona, Trikala.

The club was founded in 1967. They will play in Gamma Ethniki for the season 2015–16.

Honors

Domestic Titles and honors
 Trikala Regional Championship: 2
 2004–05, 2014-15
 Thessaly Regional Cup: 2 
 2006–07, 2008-09

External links
 https://web.archive.org/web/20150925121952/http://www.aefarkadonas.gr/

Football clubs in Thessaly
Association football clubs established in 1967
1967 establishments in Greece